Alexander Began Karmo (born October 12, 1989) is a Liberian international defender that plays for Swedish club Västerhaninge IF basing in Stockholm the capital city of Sweden.

Career

International career
The defender is also a member of the Liberia national football team.

References 

 http://www.stff.se/match/?scr=result&fmid=3808269

1989 births
Living people
Liberian footballers
Expatriate footballers in Kenya
Liberian expatriate footballers
Expatriate footballers in Vietnam
Association football defenders
Expatriate footballers in Equatorial Guinea
Expatriate footballers in Sierra Leone
Expatriate footballers in Laos
Western Stima F.C. players
Expatriate footballers in Sweden
Liberia international footballers